The Ferreñafe Province is the smallest of three provinces of the Lambayeque Region in Peru.

Boundaries 
 North: Piura Region
 East: Cajamarca Region
 South: Chiclayo Province
 West: Lambayeque Province

Political division 
The province is divided into six districts, which are:
 Ferreñafe
 Cañaris
 Incahuasi
 Manuel Antonio Mesones Muro
 Pitipo
 Pueblo Nuevo

Capital 
The capital and main city of this province is Ferreñafe.

Geography
Valleys, Andes, and rainforest.

Places of interest 
 Pómac Forest Historical Sanctuary

See also 
 Lambayeque Region
 Peru

External links 
 Video "Ferreñafe y Tradición" Marinera composed by Alejandro Segura Dávila
 Video "Ferreñafe y Tradición" Marinera (instrumental version) composed by Alejandro Segura Dávila. Additional information about the province of Ferreñafe in Lambayeque in Perú
  Official website of the Ferreñafe Province

Provinces of the Lambayeque Region